Agia Triada ( "the Holy Trinity", ;  “cavalry soldier”, previously ) is a village on the Karpas Peninsula,  east of Gialousa, in Cyprus. The village de jure is part of the internationally recognized Republic of Cyprus but since the Turkish invasion of Cyprus in 1974 it is under the de facto control of the internationally unrecognized TRNC which claims the northern illegally occupied part of Cyprus.

References

Communities in Famagusta District
Populated places in İskele District
Greek enclaves in Northern Cyprus